Lennie De Juan Bennett better known by his stage name Kel Spencer (born 1978) is an American hip hop recording artist, producer, songwriter, actor and film director from Brooklyn, New York City, New York. He is famous for having lyrically contributed to more than 20 songs from Will Smith repertoire, receiving Grammy, Soul Train and MTV Video Music awards nominations and winning an American Music Award for the platinum single "Switch". 
As a recording artist on his own, Spencer was featured on the hit soundtracks "Wild Wild West" and "American Pie: The Naked Mile" as well as on albums from Will Smith, DJ Jazzy Jeff or Grandmaster Flash.

Early life

Spencer was born in 1978 in Landstuhl, West Germany where his father, serving in the Air Force was stationed. Growing up in Brooklyn, New York City, New York, Spencer received All-star honors as high school quarterback and, at 16, went on to the Earl G. Graves school of Business at Morgan State University.

Music career

After showcasing in various hip-hop talent shows starting in 1992, Spencer was discovered by Hollywood icon Will Smith and signed in 2000 to Overbrook Entertainment/Interscope Records. He first appeared in 1999 on two songs from the Wild Wild West soundtrack, peaking at number four on the US Billboard 200 and number one on the Top R&B/Hip-Hop Albums. The same year he co-wrote 7 out of the 15 tracks off of Will Smith multi-platinum album Willennium. Spencer co-wrote the Grammy and Soul Train awards nominated "Will 2K" as well as hit single "Freakin' It" and appeared as a guest artist on the song "Uuhhh".

He later went on to co-write songs for the likes of MC Lyte, Lil J, Teddy Riley, Wyclef Jean, Nick Cannon, Lil' Kim, Carl Thomas, Heavy D, Rodney "Darkchild" Jerkins, Miri Ben-Ari, Mary J. Blige as well as the singles "Freak Freak" by Grammy Award winners The Product G&B (2001) and "It Ain't My Fault"  by So Plush (2002). Spencer teamed up again on Will Smith's 2003 album "Born to Reign" co-writing 7 tracks out of 14 including the leading single and MTV Video Music Award nominated "Black Suits Comin' (Nod Ya Head)". Spencer renewed his collaboration with Smith on 5 tracks out of Smith's platinum 2005 album "Lost and Found", including the leading single and American Music Award-winning "Switch" peaking at #7 on the Billboard Hot 100.

Spencer gained further recognition contributing to albums from DJ Jazzy Jeff and Grandmaster Flash ; placing a song on the soundtrack of box office movie "American Pie: The Naked Mile" ; contributing to various mixtapes ; and writing music for commercials, jingles and theme songs.

Spencer launched his own label, 3rd Power Music Group, released the critically acclaimed mixtape "Who is Kel Spencer" in 2005, the EP "Streets know that" in 2006, a second mixtape "Brooklyn Spartans" in 2007 and a relationship based novelty album called "Salon Stories" in 2009, hosted by MC Lyte, featuring Q-tip, Def Poets, Rivaflowz, Shanelle Gabriel, Jesse Boykins III, and more.

Acting career
Having started an acting career in the 2010s, Spencer has garnered roles and writing/directing credits in several independent films, Web series, theatre productions, and has contributed to various voice-over projects. He has produced and directed his first indie movie "Date 'N Game: The Movie" in 2015, co-written with Spencer's wife Quana BelleVoix and Lisa Harris.

References

1978 births
Living people
African-American songwriters
Songwriters from New York (state)
Record producers from New York (state)
African-American film directors
American film directors
Interscope Records artists
Morgan State University alumni
21st-century African-American people
20th-century African-American people